Oh Hye-rin (born May 7, 1989), better known by her stage name Raina, is a South Korean singer. She is best known as a former member of the South Korean girl group After School and member of the sub-unit Orange Caramel. Raina debuted with the group in November 2009 following the release of the group's third single, "Because of You". She debuted as a solo singer in September 2014 with the single "You End, And Me".

Career

Predebut
Raina tried to audition with JYP Entertainment to become a rapper before joining Pledis Entertainment. Before debut, Raina was a barista at the Coffee Bean & Tea Leaf. She also previously auditioned for Mnet's Superstar K and was a student at the SM Academy. Raina is considered to be one of the best vocalists among idol girl groups in South Korea.

2009–2014: Debut with After School and Orange Caramel
Raina officially debuted with After School for the release of their second single, "Because of You", which attained No. 1 on the Gaon Digital Chart and won the "triple crown" on SBS Inkigayo. She debuted in After School's sub-unit Orange Caramel on June 18, 2010, on KBS Music Bank with the song "Magic Girl". She released her first solo single for the My Shining Girl OST in February 2012. Raina has written lyrics for Orange Caramel's "Still..." and "Standing in This Place". Raina also wrote the lyrics for After School's "Love Love Love" and "Timeless".

2014–present: Solo career
On June 12, 2014, Raina and rapper San E released an R&B duet called A Midsummer Night's Sweetness. The collaboration topped all major music charts in South Korea soon after it was released, and it was No. 4 on the year-end Gaon Digital Chart.

In October 2014, Raina became the first After School member to make a solo debut with the release her solo single titled Reset, which was released on October 8. The single consists of title track You End, and Me and b-side track Repertoire.

Raina released her second digital single titled I Don't Know on November 24, 2015.

On June 16, 2016, Raina and rapper San E released their second duet, called Sugar and Me.

On June 5, 2017, Raina released her third OST titled When Rain Falls for MBC's drama "Lookout"; fellow After School member E-young participated in lyric-writing, composition and arrangement for the track.
Raina released her first single album, Loop on July 31. The single album contains three tracks, with title track Loop featuring NU'EST's Aron.

In August 2018, Raina released the single It's Okay as part of a project single with producer Bumzu. Subsequently, on September 5, 2018, Raina's soundtrack single entitled Home was released as the fifth OST for SBS' drama "Your Honor". On December 17, 2019, it was shared that Raina had left Pledis following the expiration of her contract.

Following her departure from Pledis, Raina has yet to join an agency. In April 2020 Raina participated in her first project since leaving Pledis as a member of the X-MAS project in which she released her version of Lena Park's Ann (앤). To much excitement of fans, Raina released her next OST for KBS's Once Again alongside former Myteen member and Produce X 101 contestant Song Yuvin, called Love is Danger. Since then, Raina has been announced as part of the line-up for MBN's female idol revival show "Miss Back" hosted by Baek Ji-young.

On December 4, 2021, Raina signed a contract with Aer Music.

Discography

Single albums

Singles

Other songs

Theater

Awards and nominations

Mnet Asian Music Awards 

|-
| rowspan="2"| 2014 
| rowspan="2"|San E & Raina –  "A Midsummer Night's Sweetness"
|Song of the Year
| 
|-
| Best Collaboration
|

Melon Music Awards 

|-
| rowspan="3"| 2014
| rowspan="3"|San E & Raina –  "A Midsummer Night's Sweetness"
| Song of the Year
| 
|-
| Hot Trend Award
| 
|-
| Rap/Hip Hop
|

Golden Disc Awards 

|-
| 2015
| San E & Raina –  "A Midsummer Night's Sweetness"
| Digital Bonsang
|

Seoul Music Awards 

|-
| 2014
| San E & Raina –  "A Midsummer Night's Sweetness"
| Hip Hop/Rap Award
|

Gaon Chart K-Pop Awards 

|-
| 2014
| San E & Raina –  "A Midsummer Night's Sweetness"
| Artist of the Year –  July
|

Notes

References

External links

  

1989 births
Living people
People from Ulsan
Pledis Entertainment artists
South Korean female idols
South Korean women pop singers
After School (band) members
Orange Caramel members
Melon Music Award winners
21st-century South Korean singers
21st-century South Korean women singers